Parmursa is a genus of tardigrades, in the subfamily Euclavarctinae which is part of the family Halechiniscidae. The genus was named and described by Jeanne Renaud-Mornant in 1984.

Species
The genus includes two species:
 Parmursa fimbriata Renaud-Mornant, 1984
 Parmursa torquata Hansen, 2007

References

Publications
Renaud-Mornant, 1984: Halechiniscidae (Heterotardigrada) de la campagne Benthedi, Canal du Mozambique. [Halechiniscidae (Heterotardigrada) from the Benthedi campaign, Mozambique Channel] Bulletin of the Muséum National d'Histoire Naturelle, Section A: Zoology, Biology and Animal Ecology, vol. 6, no 1, p. 67-88.

Tardigrade genera
Halechiniscidae